Learning difficulties may refer to:

Learning disability, difficulty learning in a typical manner, often divided into:
Dyslexia, difficulty in learning to read fluently
Dyscalculia, difficulty in learning or comprehending arithmetic

Intellectual disability, significantly impaired cognitive functioning and adaptive deficits appearing before adulthood

Note that the term learning disability means "difficulty learning in a typical manner" in North America but refers specifically to "intellectual disability" in the United Kingdom.
For more information, see the section on History of the terminology (United Kingdom).